Star Trek Beyond is a 2016 American science fiction action film directed by Justin Lin, written by Simon Pegg and Doug Jung, and based on the television series Star Trek created by Gene Roddenberry. It is the 13th film in the Star Trek franchise and the third installment in the reboot series, following Star Trek (2009) and Star Trek Into Darkness (2013). Chris Pine and Zachary Quinto reprise their respective roles as Captain James T. Kirk and Commander Spock, with Pegg, Karl Urban, Zoe Saldana, John Cho, and Anton Yelchin reprising their roles from the previous films. This was one of Yelchin's last films; he died in June 2016, a month before the film's release. Idris Elba, Sofia Boutella, Joe Taslim, and Lydia Wilson also appear.

Principal photography began in Vancouver on June 25, 2015. The film premiered in Sydney on July 7, 2016, and was released in the United States on July 22, 2016, by Paramount Pictures. The film is dedicated to the memory of Yelchin, as well as to actor Leonard Nimoy, who died during pre-production. The film grossed $343.5 million at the box office, and received positive reviews with praise for Lin's direction, the acting, action sequences, musical score, and visual effects. At the 89th Academy Awards, the film was nominated for Best Makeup and Hairstyling.

Plot

The Federation starship USS Enterprise arrives at starbase Yorktown, for resupply and shore leave for its crew. Struggling to find meaning in their exploration, Captain James T. Kirk has applied for a promotion to vice admiral; he recommends Spock as his replacement. Meanwhile, Hikaru Sulu reunites with his family, Montgomery Scott works to keep the ship operational, and Spock and Nyota Uhura have ended their relationship; Spock also receives word from New Vulcan that Ambassador Spock has died.

Enterprise is dispatched on a rescue mission after an escape pod drifts out of a nearby uncharted nebula. Its occupant, Kalara, claims her ship is stranded on Altamid, a planet in the nebula. Upon arrival, a massive swarm of small ships ambushes the Enterprise and quickly tears it apart. The swarm's leader, Krall, and his crew board the crippled Enterprise, capture and kill many crew members, and attempt to capture the Abronath, a relic recovered during a recent mission. Kirk orders the crew to abandon ship, leaving the disintegrating Enterprise saucer section to crash on Altamid.

On the planet, Krall captures Sulu, Uhura, and other survivors. Kirk and Pavel Chekov, accompanied by Kalara, locate the Enterprises saucer section. Knowing that Kalara knew they would be attacked, Kirk tricks her into revealing herself as Krall's spy. She is killed when Kirk and Chekov escape Krall's soldiers and flip the Enterprise saucer, crushing her. Elsewhere on the planet, Dr. Leonard McCoy and a wounded Spock search for other survivors. Spock tells McCoy that he ended his relationship with Uhura and is leaving Starfleet to help the Vulcan survivors and continue the late Ambassador Spock's work. Jaylah, a scavenger who previously escaped Krall's encampment where her father was killed, rescues Scott and takes him to her makeshift home, the grounded USS Franklin, an early Starfleet vessel reported missing over a century earlier. Scott is reunited with Kirk, Chekov, McCoy and Spock. Krall coerces the captive Enterprise crew to hand over the Abronath, then uses it to complete an ancient bioweapon. With the device complete, Krall intends to kill Yorktowns inhabitants, then use the base to attack the United Federation of Planets. Kirk and the others free the crew as Krall launches into space with the bioweapon, leading his drones to Yorktown.

The Enterprise survivors power up the Franklin and launch her in pursuit of Krall. Theorizing the swarm's system may be vulnerable to high frequencies such as VHF or radio, they jam and destroy the swarm by broadcasting the song "Sabotage" by the Beastie Boys. Krall is chased by the Franklin through Yorktown. Uhura, Kirk and Scotty discover from the Franklins logs that Krall is actually Balthazar Edison, Franklins former captain. A pre-Federation human soldier, Edison rejected the Federation's principles of unity and cooperation with former enemies like the Xindi and the Romulans. When he and his crew were stranded on Altamid by a wormhole, the survivors used the extinct natives' technology to prolong their lives at the cost of the others and re-purposed the ancient race's dormant mining drone workers into the swarm. Thinking the Federation had abandoned them, Edison planned to destroy the Federation and resume galactic conflict. Kirk pursues Edison into Yorktowns ventilation system, where Edison activates the bioweapon. Before it can spread, Kirk ejects it and Edison into space, where the weapon disintegrates Edison. Using a commandeered alien ship, Spock and McCoy save Kirk moments before he is also blown into space.

In the aftermath, Commodore Paris closes the files of Captain Edison and the USS Franklin crew. Though offered the promotion to vice admiral, Kirk decides to remain as a captain; Spock chooses to remain in Starfleet and renews his relationship with Uhura. On Kirk's recommendation, Jaylah is accepted into Starfleet Academy. As the crew celebrates Kirk's birthday, they watch the construction of their new ship, the USS Enterprise-A—and resume their mission.

Cast

Chris Pine as Captain James T. Kirk, commanding officer of the USS Enterprise
Zachary Quinto as Commander Spock, first officer and science officer
Karl Urban as Lieutenant Commander Leonard McCoy, chief medical officer
Zoe Saldana as Lieutenant Nyota Uhura, communications officer
Simon Pegg as Lieutenant Commander Montgomery Scott, second officer and chief engineer
John Cho as Lieutenant Hikaru Sulu, third officer and helmsman
Anton Yelchin as Ensign Pavel Chekov, the ship's main navigator. This was Yelchin's final performance as Chekov, as he died on June 19, 2016. 
Idris Elba as Captain Balthazar Edison / Krall, former commander of the USS Franklin who became a powerful mutated alien creature
Sofia Boutella as Jaylah, an alien scavenger. The role was originally developed for Jennifer Lawrence, the character being referred to by her "J-Law" nickname throughout the film's development. Despite Boutella's casting, the name was kept, with the same pronunciation, but a different spelling.
Joe Taslim as Anderson Le / Manas, Krall's henchman and second-in-command who was also transformed.
Lydia Wilson as Jessica Wolff / Kalara, Krall's henchwoman and trusted lieutenant who was also transformed.
Sara Maria Forsberg as the alien voice-over
Deep Roy as Keenser, Scotty's assistant
Melissa Roxburgh as Ensign Syl
Shohreh Aghdashloo as Commodore Paris, commanding officer of Starbase Yorktown
Greg Grunberg as Commander Finnegan, Yorktown first officer
Danny Pudi as Fi'Ja
Kim Kold as Zavanko
Anita Brown as Tyvanna
Doug Jung as Ben
Dan Payne as Wadjet
Shea Whigham as Teenaxi Leader

Leonard Nimoy appears in a photo cameo as Spock Prime, alongside George Takei, Walter Koenig, William Shatner, James Doohan, DeForest Kelley, and Nichelle Nichols as the Prime versions of Sulu, Chekov, Kirk, Scott, McCoy, and Uhura, respectively. Jeff Bezos cameos as an alien Starfleet official. Carlo Ancelotti has a brief cameo as a doctor at Starbase Yorktown.

Production

Development
Abrams returned only as a producer so he could focus on directing Star Wars: The Force Awakens. Writer-producer Roberto Orci was announced as director in May 2014. He would have been making his directorial debut. However, in December, Orci's role was also listed as a producer only, with Edgar Wright considered to replace him as director, along with a shortlist of others, including Rupert Wyatt, Morten Tyldum, Daniel Espinosa, Justin Lin and Duncan Jones. Also, Star Trek actor and director Jonathan Frakes expressed interest in the job. At the end of the month, Lin was announced as director of the third installment.

Screenplay
In 2013, Orci had begun writing the script with Patrick McKay and J. D. Payne, with Payne saying of the script in March, "We really want to get back to the sense of exploration and wonder. The kind of optimistic sense of the future that Star Trek has always kind of had at its core. It's the Chicago Bulls in space, in terms of these people who are all awesome at their job." In January 2015, after Orci's departure as director, Simon Pegg and Doug Jung were hired to rewrite the screenplay, with Pegg saying on the previous draft, Paramount "had a script for Star Trek that wasn't really working for them. I think the studio was worried that it might have been a little bit too Star Trek-y." Pegg had been asked to make the new film "more inclusive", stating that the solution was to "make a western or a thriller or a heist movie, then populate that with Star Trek characters so it's more inclusive to an audience that might be a little bit reticent."

Casting
The first film's major cast members signed on for two sequels as part of their original deals. In 2014, early in the film's development, William Shatner said that he was contacted by producer Abrams to see if he would be interested in a possible role, but as the process continued and the script changed hands, the role never materialized. Alice Eve was not included in the film despite her character having joined the Enterprise crew at the end of the last installment, because Pegg, in writing the script, did not have anything meaningful for her to do; however, he stressed that Eve could appear in a later installment. Joseph Gatt's cyborg Science Officer 0718 was dropped from the film after a rewrite. In March 2015, Idris Elba was in early talks to play the villain, and he was confirmed for the role in the following months. Pegg noted that the villain would be an original one, rather than a known antagonist from past stories in the Star Trek franchise. In April, Sofia Boutella joined the cast in a lead role, and in early July, Deep Roy was confirmed to reprise his role of Keenser. That month, Joe Taslim was added to the cast opposite Elba's villain, and by August, Lydia Wilson joined as well. In March 2016, Shohreh Aghdashloo was cast as Commodore Paris for reshoots on the film.

Filming
Principal photography on the film began on June 25, 2015, in Vancouver, and Squamish, British Columbia, after several delays caused by multiple script rejections. Additional filming locations were Seoul, South Korea, and Dubai, United Arab Emirates. Principal filming ended on October 15, 2015. In March 2016, production underwent reshoots, with Aghdashloo added to the cast.

Visual effects
The visual effects are provided by Atomic Fiction, DNEG and Kelvin Optical and Supervised by Kevin Baillie, Ryan Tudhope, Pauline Duvall and Peter Chiang as the Production Supervisor with help from Rodeo FX.

Music

In August 2015, composer Michael Giacchino confirmed that he would return to write the score. On June 26, 2016, singer Rihanna released a teaser across her social media accounts for a single for the film entitled "Sledgehammer", and the song premiered the following day. The Beastie Boys' "Sabotage" was used in the movie's trailer, as well as the final battle scene.

Marketing
A teaser trailer for the film was released on December 14, 2015, and was criticized by some fans for focusing too much on action, and for featuring the Beastie Boys song "Sabotage", which many considered out of place, despite its use in the first film of the rebooted series. Pegg expressed similar thoughts of dissatisfaction with the teaser, saying that he "didn't love it" because "I know there's a lot more to the film." He interpreted the trailer to be a way of the marketing team saying, "Come and see this movie! It's full of action and fun!" A second trailer was released on May 20, 2016, to warmer reviews. A third and final trailer was released on June 27, 2016, featuring Rihanna's single "Sledgehammer".

Release

Theatrical
The film was released in 2D, RealD 3D, IMAX 3D and Barco Escape. In August 2014, it was announced that Paramount had pushed back the release of the film to 2016, for the 50th anniversary celebration of the debut of Gene Roddenberry's original sci-fi series. In December, it was announced that the film was to be released on July 8, 2016. In September 2015, the film's release date was pushed back to July 22, 2016. The film was released in Dolby Cinema format in selected theaters. The film had its Australian premiere in Sydney on July 7.

Home media
Star Trek Beyond was released on Digital HD on October 4, 2016, and on Ultra HD Blu-ray, Blu-ray and DVD on November 1, 2016.

Reception

Box office
Star Trek Beyond underperformed financially at the box office. Scott Mendelson of Forbes observed that one factor contributing to the film's underperformance was its untimely release in a crowded summer in which it was surrounded by other films like Ghostbusters, Jason Bourne and Suicide Squad. He also noted that had Paramount released the film for the Star Treks 50th anniversary on September 8, the film could have benefited from that occasion, as demonstrated in October 2012 when MGM released the James Bond film Skyfall (which went on to gross over $1 billion) for that series' 50th anniversary.

Star Trek Beyond grossed $158.8 million in the United States and Canada and $184.6 million in other countries for a worldwide total of $343.5 million, against a production budget of $185 million. It had a global opening of $89.2 million and an IMAX opening of $11.6 million on 571 IMAX screens. Industry analyst Danny Cox had previously estimated that in order for the film to break even, it would have to earn $340–350 million worldwide, and ended losing an estimated $50.5 million.

North America
In the United States and Canada, the film was projected to gross $50–60 million from 3,928 theaters in its opening weekend. It opened alongside Ice Age: Collision Course and Lights Out, but critics noted that the film did not face any direct competition with them. It opened across 3,928 theaters, of which 391 were IMAX. It made $5.5 million from Thursday previews from 3,100 theaters, an improvement over its two immediate predecessors. Of that, the film grossed $1.1 million on 387 IMAX screens. This includes revenues generated from Wednesday night, when Paramount screened all Star Trek films, which concluded with a 10pm screening of Beyond. On its opening day, it earned $22.3 million, which is the second-biggest among the franchise, only behind Star Trek ($30.9 million), the third-biggest opening day of the summer for a live-action film and the second-biggest opening day of the year for a non-comic book superhero live-action film, behind only The Jungle Book. It earned $59.3 million in its opening weekend, which is the third-biggest debut among the franchise but the lowest of the reboot series (behind Star Trek and Star Trek Into Darkness for both). Adjusted for inflation, it ranks fourth behind the aforementioned films and Star Trek: First Contact ($60 million). It performed exceptionally well in IMAX making $8.7 million in 387 IMAX screens. The film came in 14% lower than the opening of its immediate predecessor, Star Trek Into Darkness, but box office experts noted that the fall was mild in comparison to other sequels of 2016 and is still considered a hit. It dropped precipitously by 69% on its second Friday and was overtaken by newcomer spy film Jason Bourne, earning $6.75 million. By comparison, Star Trek dropped 56% on its first Friday while Star Trek into Darkness fell 53%. However, this was not the worst Friday-to-Friday drop for a Star Trek film, as Star Trek: Nemesis plunged 83% on its second Friday due to negative word-of-mouth and heavy competition from The Lord of the Rings: The Two Towers.

By the second and third weekend following the film's release, box office revenue continued to drop significantly due to the release of competing films like Jason Bourne and Suicide Squad.

Outside North America
Internationally, the film received a scattered release pattern and was released across approximately 76 markets. It opened in 37 markets in conjunction with its North American release in its first weekend, including in the United Kingdom, Germany and Australia — territories where the franchise has traditionally performed well. It earned a total of $30 million from the said number of markets which is slightly lower than Star Trek Into Darkness $31.7 million international debut in 2013. Paramount said that the heatwave in Europe negatively impacted the weekend's results. Beyond debuted at first place in 16 of them and recorded the biggest opening weekend ever for the franchise in 17 markets, including Russia, Taiwan and Thailand. It debuted in third place overall at the international box office, behind Skiptrace and The Legend of Tarzan. Beyond set numerous records in IMAX theaters. Led by very strong results in the UK and Russia, it grossed an estimated weekend of $3.2 million on 184 screens besting Star Trek Into Darkness $2.8 million debut. In its second weekend, it fell drastically by 57% earning $13 million. As a result, it slipped into sixth place at the box office. After fluctuating up and down the charts, it finally topped the international box office in its seventh weekend due to a robust debut in China and remained at the top for the second weekend in a row.

The highest international tallies were recorded in the United Kingdom, Ireland and Malta ($6.1 million), South Korea ($5.6 million), Germany ($4.5 million), Russia and the CIS ($3.3 million), Australia ($3 million), France ($2.1 million), Mexico ($1.5 million), Brazil ($1.6 million), Venezuela ($1.4 million) and Taiwan ($1 million). In the United Kingdom, where the performance of the franchise has been consistently solid, it was edged out by the family film The BFG. Its £4.74 million ($6.2 million) opening from 535 theaters is the lowest among the rebooted series and a 31% decline from the £8.43 million ($11 million) opening posted by Star Trek Into Darkness, if previews are deducted. The Guardian cited J. J. Abrams' departure as the director and fans' unenthusiastic response to Idris Elba as the villain (in comparison to Benedict Cumberbatch in Star Trek Into Darkness) as some possible reasons why the film failed to generate lucrative revenue. The site also projected a total gross of around £20 million ($26 million+) for the film.

It opened in China on September 2, and earned an estimated $9.30 million on its opening day (representing 66% of the total marketplace), including $370,000 in midnight preview showings (160% larger than the opening day of Star Trek Into Darkness), and $21.8 million in two days. In total, it had an opening weekend of $31.3 million (per Paramount) and $30.7 million (according to Chinese box office service Ent Group) from 6,259 screens, marking the biggest Star Trek debut in country which is 105% bigger than the opening of Star Trek Into Darkness. It was the only one of five new releases to make any impression on the chart. It remained at the top of the box office for a second weekend by adding another $10.1 million (according to Chinese data provider Ent Group), or $11.37 million (according to Paramount) from 5,830 locations from Friday to Sunday, a steep decline of 62.6% from its previous weekend. It fell out of the top 10 in its third weekend, and has grossed a total of $64.2 million there. It is projected the film will end its run there anywhere around $70–100 million, a disappointing figure considering the robust marketing effort by investors Alibaba Pictures and Huahua Media. Thus, the film is the second Paramount film to underperform in that corner following Teenage Mutant Ninja Turtles: Out of the Shadows in July.

In terms of total earnings, its biggest offshore markets are the United Kingdom ($13.3 million), Germany ($8.6 million), Russia and the CIS ($5.5 million) and Australia ($5.2 million). Star Trek Beyond opened in Japan on October 21, where it has earned $4.9 million as of 17 November 2016.

Critical response
On Rotten Tomatoes, the film has an approval rating of 86% based on 310 reviews, with an average rating of 7.00/10. The website's critical consensus reads, "Star Trek Beyond continues the franchise's post-reboot hot streak with an epic sci-fi adventure that honors the series' sci-fi roots without skimping on the blockbuster action." On Metacritic, the film has a score of 68 out of 100, based on 50 critics, indicating "generally favorable reviews". Audiences polled by CinemaScore gave the film an average grade of "A−" on an A+ to F scale, down from the first two films' "A".

Richard Roeper of the Chicago Sun-Times gave the film 3 stars out of 4 and said, "Even with its big-screen pyrotechnics and its feature-length running time, Star Trek Beyond plays like an extended version of one of the better episodes from the original series, and I mean that in the best possible way." Scott Collura of IGN awarded the film 8.4/10, describing it as being: "terrific, a fun and exciting entry in the series that balances subtle fan service while also feeling fresh and modern; Star Trek Beyond is the perfect way to celebrate the series’ 50th anniversary." David Rooney of The Hollywood Reporter said the screenplay by Simon Pegg and Doug Jung "injects a welcome strain of humor that's true to the original Gene Roddenberry creation, delivering nostalgia without stiff veneration", and went on by saying, "While Beyond won't unseat 1982's thrilling The Wrath of Khan as the gold standard for Star Trek movies, it's a highly entertaining entry guaranteed to give the franchise continuing life." Owen Gleiberman of Variety, in an otherwise positive review, described the film being: "a very familiar, old-fangled, no-mystery structure, and that's because it's basically the Star Trek version of an interplanetary action film, with a plot that doesn't take you to many new frontiers." Furthermore, he called Star Trek Beyond "a somewhat diverting place holder, but one hopes that the next Star Trek movie will have what it takes to boldly go where no Star Trek movie has gone before." Mark Hugues of Forbes said, "Star Trek Beyond is the third-best Star Trek film of all time, creating the sort of emotional connection and familiar, powerful characterizations we loved in the original series while delivering top-notch action and the best Star Trek movie villain since First Contacts Borg Queen."

The film was also met by critics who were less taken with the film. Kyle Smith of the New York Post gave the film 1½ stars out of 4 and he commented that the filmmakers "should have called it Star Trek Into Drowsiness." Smith later added, "Beyond is tepid when it's trying to be emotional, moronic when it's trying to be thrilling and unfunny when it's trying to be non-unfunny. It lacks a storytelling module: Things just click into place when needed, as when Kirk commands Scotty to rev up a busted old spaceship, Scott says it's impossible, and 14 seconds later everything is ready to rip." James Berardinelli of Reelviews gave 2½ stars out of 4, writing: "Star Trek Beyond is a Star Trek movie, although not an especially good one; The action sequences are frenetic, kinetic, and, at times, incoherent. This isn't unexpected; it's Lin's trademark. But the plot, credited to Simon Pegg & Doug Jung, is pure Trek. Unfortunately, it's also instantly forgettable." Dave Robinson of outlet Crash Landed writes that "Star Trek Beyond fails to push beyond its own roots and becomes just another very safe sci-fi popcorn movie in an increasingly crowded market, that will likely have you leaving the theatre feeling exactly as you entered." Chris Nashawaty of Entertainment Weekly gave the film a C+ and wrote, "[w]ith Beyond, it feels like just another summer tentpole with not enough going on underneath the tent."

Accolades

Sequel

A planned fourth film has been announced several times since the release of Beyond. Pine and Quinto had signed contracts to return as Kirk and Spock for a fourth film should one be made. In July 2016, Abrams confirmed plans for a fourth film and stated that Chris Hemsworth would return as Kirk's father, George, whom he played in the prologue of the first film. Later that month, Paramount confirmed the return of Hemsworth, as well as most of the Beyond cast, producers Abrams and Lindsey Weber, and writers J. D. Payne and Patrick McKay. That same month, Abrams said that Chekov would not be recast, after Anton Yelchin died in an accident outside his residence in California.

In December 2017, it was revealed that Quentin Tarantino had pitched an idea for a potential Star Trek film to Abrams and Paramount, and in 2019 Tarantino confirmed he had signed the contract from Paramount, who was reportedly enthusiastic about the idea. Tarantino was mentioned as a possibility to direct the film if his schedule allowed, and that Abrams and Paramount would attempt to assemble a writers' room to explore the concept. On December 22, writer Mark L. Smith was hired by Paramount and Bad Robot to write a screenplay based on Tarantino's original pitch, with Tarantino expected to direct.

In April 2018, it was announced that two new Star Trek films were in development at Paramount. Later that month, it was announced that S. J. Clarkson would direct the second Star Trek film in development, and that the film would enter production before Tarantino's film. J.D. Payne and Patrick McKay would co-write the screenplay, while Abrams and Lindsey Weber would co-produce the project. In August 2018, Pine and Hemsworth walked away from negotiations to star in the film after refusing to take pay cuts as a result of Star Trek Beyonds reported under-performance at the domestic box office. According to Hemsworth, the reason for his exit was because he found the script underwhelming. In January 2019, Paramount reportedly cancelled development of the fourth installment.

In May 2019, Tarantino confirmed that his Trek film was still in development, saying: 
On November 19, 2019, it was reported that Pine had signed on to return for a fourth installment alongside Quinto, Saldana, Pegg, and Urban, and that Noah Hawley was in talks to write and direct the film. Pegg later stated that he had no knowledge of the reboot cast's return in the film. The following year, it was announced that Hawley's movie had been put on indefinite hold, reportedly by Paramount's new president to get a better handle on how to move the film franchise forward. In  November 2020, it was revealed that the project was cancelled and Hawley left.

In December 2019, it was reported that Tarantino had left his proposed film, looking to make a smaller budget film. In January 2020, Tarantino stated the film "might" be made, but he would not direct it.<ref>{{cite web |url=https://www.indiewire.com/2020/01/quentin-tarantino-star-trek-exit-1202203086/ |title=Quentin Tarantino hints at Star Trek exit: "I don't think I'm going to direct it |website=IndieWire |first=Zack |last=Sharf |date=January 14, 2020 |access-date=January 14, 2020 |archive-date=January 14, 2020 |archive-url=https://web.archive.org/web/20200114155507/https://www.indiewire.com/2020/01/quentin-tarantino-star-trek-exit-1202203086/ |url-status=live }}</ref> In March 2021, Star Trek: Discovery writer Kalinda Vazquez was hired by Paramount to pen a new Star Trek'' film, which is said to be based on an original story. The following month, it was announced that the next installment in the franchise would be released on June 9, 2023, with Abrams returning to produce; sources at the time reported the 2023 release would not be the Vazquez script. Matt Shakman was hired as the director in July 2021, and the release date has been delayed to December 2023. While no plans were official, Paramount hoped that cast members, including Pine, would return for the film. In February 2022, it was announced that shooting for the film would begin at the end of the year and the cast was in talks to return for the film, including Pine, Quinto, Pegg, Urban, Saldaña, and Cho. On August 26, 2022, Shakman exited the film, citing "scheduling issues".

See also
 List of films featuring space stations
 List of films featuring extraterrestrials

References

External links

 
 Official database website 
 
 

2016 films
2016 3D films
2016 LGBT-related films
2010s English-language films
2016 science fiction action films
2010s science fiction adventure films
American science fiction action films
American science fiction adventure films
American sequel films
Films about interracial romance
Films set in the 23rd century
Films set in the future
Films set on fictional planets
Films shot in Dubai
Films shot in Seoul
Films shot in Vancouver
IMAX films
Beyond
Bad Robot Productions films
Skydance Media films
Alibaba Pictures films
Paramount Pictures films
Films scored by Michael Giacchino
Films directed by Justin Lin
Films produced by J. J. Abrams
Films produced by Roberto Orci
Films with screenplays by Simon Pegg
2010s American films